Tommy "Red" McMillan was a Scottish association football fullback who played in the American Soccer League.

McMillan played for Kirkintilloch Rob Roy F.C. and Dunfermline Athletic F.C. before moving to the United States where he signed with Boston Soccer Club in 1924. In 1927, he moved to the New Bedford Whalers. During McMillan's three seasons with Boston, the team won the ASL league cup twice (1925 and 1927). McMillan played for New Bedford until at least the end of the 1931 season. However, the team went through several name changes. In the spring of 1931, it became Fall River F.C. Then in the fall of 1931, it merged with the Fall River Marksmen and retook the Whalers name.

External links

References

American Soccer League (1921–1933) players
Boston Soccer Club players
New Bedford Whalers players
Scottish footballers
Scottish expatriate footballers
Year of birth missing
Place of birth missing
Place of death missing
Association football defenders
Scottish expatriate sportspeople in the United States
Expatriate soccer players in the United States